Up or out, also known as a tenure or partnership system, is the requirement for members of a hierarchical organization to achieve a certain rank within a certain period of time. If they fail to do so, they must leave the organization.

Examples

Private sector 
"Up or out" is practiced throughout the accounting industry in North America, most notably at the Big Four accounting firms, which also practice this policy in their branches in other countries.

Up or out is also practiced in the investment banking industry, where third year analysts and third year associates who will not be promoted are asked to leave the bank.

The management consulting industry also practices up or out, where it is commonly regarded as a sign of the industry's "hard-nosed approach to doing business" with Bain & Co and McKinsey & Company being the two consultancies most closely associated with the approach. According to Leslie Perlow, up or out is also employed at Boston Consulting Group.

Among many other law firms, Cravath, Swaine & Moore's so-called "Cravath System" historically expected associate lawyers to achieve partner status within ten years of being hired or to leave the firm.

U.S. entrepreneur Vivek Wadhwa has argued that engineering in Silicon Valley is also "an 'up or out' profession: you either move up the ladder or face unemployment".

Military 
In the U.S. military, the 1980 Defense Officer Personnel Management Act mandates that officers passed over twice for promotion are required to be discharged from the military. It has been criticized as "arbitrary and bad management" that forces out "many fit, experienced officers... because there were only so many slots into which they could be promoted." Paul V. Kane, a Marine veteran of Iraq War and a former fellow at Harvard Kennedy School, argued in 2009 that the "archaic 'up or out' military promotion system should be scrapped."

Manning control within the British Army plays a similar role.

Diplomacy
The United States Foreign Service has used an up-or-out system since 1980. The American Foreign Service Association, the professional organization for foreign service officers, has criticized the system on the grounds that it penalizes otherwise-dedicated officers who do not wish to enter Senior Foreign Service.

Academia

Tenure-track professors in the United States are usually subject to an up-or-out system. Newly hired professors, most often with the rank of assistant professor, must impress their department with their accomplishments to be awarded tenure, usually but not always combined with promotion to associate professor. Those not awarded tenure within a fixed time may be terminated. This first promotion may be required for tenure and further promotions are neither guaranteed nor necessary.

Discussion
Despite widespread use in certain industries, a 1988 textbook by Michael Jensen noted that the system's effects on productivity have not been studied in depth.

See also 
 Forced ranking
 Lifetime employment
 Mandatory retirement
 Peter principle

References

Human resource management